Pain Language is a collaborative studio album by American Los Angeles-based record producer DJ Muggs and rapper Planet Asia. It was released on September 16, 2008 via Gold Dust Media. Recording sessions took place at the Soul Assassins Compound. Production was handled entirely by Muggs, who also served as executive producer. It features guest appearances from B-Real, Chace Infinite, Cynic, GZA, Killah Priest, Prodigal Sunn, Scratch, Sick Jacken, Tri State and Turbin. Its first single will be "9mm" b/w "That's What It Is", which was made available for free download through SoulAssassins.com.

Track listing

Personnel
Lawrence "DJ Muggs" Muggerud – main artist, arranger, mixing, producer, executive producer
Jason "Planet Asia" Green – main artist, vocals (tracks: 1, 2, 4-10, 12-16)
Louis "B-Real" Freese – featured artist (tracks: 4, 7)
Joaquin "Sick Jacken" Gonzalez – featured artist (track 8)
Walter "Killah Priest" Reed – featured artist (track 10)
Richard "Cynic" Alfaro – featured artist (track 10)
Kyle "Scratch" Jones – featured artist (track 10)
Vergil "Prodigal Sunn" Ruff – featured artist (track 13)
Donti "Tri State" Ceruti – featured artist (track 13)
Ron "Turbin" Real – featured artist (track 14)
Aaron "Chace Infinite" Johnson – featured artist (tracks: 14, 16)
Gary "GZA" Grice – featured artist (track 16)
Steve Ferlazzo – keyboards (tracks: 1, 2, 4-6, 8-15)
Mikey Fingers – guitar (track 3)
"DJ Khalil" Abdul-Rahman – keyboards (tracks: 4, 5, 8, 14), bass & piano (track 16)
Keefus Green – keyboards (tracks: 7, 10)
Dan Cephus – guitar (tracks: 8, 13), bass (track 8)
Ernesto "Ern Dog" Medina – recording
Richard "Segal" Huredia – mixing
Eddy Schreyer – mastering
Dave "DJ Solo" Abrams – design
Cesario Montano – photography

References

External links

2008 albums
DJ Muggs albums
Planet Asia albums
Collaborative albums
Albums produced by DJ Muggs